Miguel Angel Canto Solis (born January 30, 1948) is a Mexican former world boxing champion who held the WBC and Lineal flyweight titles.

Boxing life 

Unlike many Mexican boxers, Canto was not a "slam-bang" type of boxer ("Slam-Bang" boxers are boxers whose fights are usually action-packed; Mexican boxers are usually stereotyped as "slam-bangers"). He used boxing techniques and knowledge instead of trying to score knockouts in most of his fights. Proof of this is that he only won fifteen fights by knockout, out of more than seventy professional bouts. He was a defensive expert, somewhat in the style of Willie Pep.

Canto began his professional boxing career on February 5, 1969. He became one of those rare cases in boxing, like Alexis Argüello, Henry Armstrong, Bernard Hopkins, Victor Luvi Callejas and Wilfredo Vazquez, where a boxer loses his first fight and goes on to become a world champion. He lost that day to Raul Hernandez, in Canto's hometown of Mérida, by a knockout in round three.

First win 

His first win came against Pedro Martinez, on May 5, 1969, by a four round decision, also at Mérida. Canto lost his next fight, but a streak of seven undefeated fights (he went 5-0-2, with 2 knockouts during that streak), led him to fight Vicente Pool on May 27 of 1970, for the Yucatán state Flyweight title. Canto won his first professional belt when he outpointed Pool over twelve rounds. In his first defense, he retained the crown, with a twelve round decision over Jose Luis Cetina. After losing his next bout, a ten round, non title bout against Tarcisio Gomez, on a decision, he went on to win 21 bouts in a row, including his first bout outside Mérida (a two round knockout of Pedro Martinez in Cansahcab, Mexico), and a win over Constantino Garcia on January 22, 1972, by twelve round decision, to claim the Mexican Flyweight title. On January 31, 1973, he fought to a ten round draw (tie) against perennial contender Ignacio Espinal.

After winning his next four fights, including a rematch victory over Tarcisio Gomez, he was given his first world title try, when he fought Betulio González in Maracaibo, Venezuela, for the WBA world Flyweight title. In what was also his first fight abroad, he was outpointed by the equally legendary Gonzalez, considered by many to be Venezuela's greatest fighter of all time, on August 4 of 1973.

WBC World Flyweight Champion Reign

Canto won six more fights, including two Mexican title defenses, and on January 8, 1975, he faced WBC world Flyweight champion Shoji Oguma in Sendai. Canto defeated Oguma by a fifteen round decision to claim the WBC and vacant lineal flyweight titles. His dream of becoming a world champion finally realized, Canto was a busy champion, mixing several non-title bouts with his title defenses. In his next fight, he beat Espinal in a rematch by a ten round decision. In his first title defense, he avenged his loss to Betulio Gonzalez by a fifteen round decision. On August 23 of that year, he defeated OPBF champion Jiro Takada by 11th round TKO. Following that win, Canto faced Espinal for a third time and retained his title once again by a fifteen round decision. On May 15, 1976, he scored a win over former champion Susumu Hanagata. Canto eventually became a traveling world champion.

For his fifth title defense, he returned to Venezuela and defeated Gonzalez for the second time in their trilogy by a fifteen round decision. One month later, he retained the crown against Orlando Javierto, once again by fifteen round decision, in Los Angeles, California.

On April 24, 1977, he returned to Venezuela for a third time, retaining the title against Reyes Arnal by a fifteen round decision in Caracas. Two months later, he beat Kimio Furesawa by a fifteen round decision in Tokyo. Then, he and Martin Vargas fought the first of their two bouts: on September 17, 1977, Canto outpointed Vargas in his hometown of Mérida.

It was Canto's turn to travel to Vargas' hometown of Santiago, Chile, for their rematch, held on November 30 of the same year. Canto once again retained the titles with a fifteen round decision.

In 1978, Canto retained his title three times, including two rematches with Shoji Oguma, both of them held in Japan, and another fifteen round points win over Facomrom Vibonchai, in a fight held at Houston, Texas.

By this time, Canto's name had become a household name all over Latin America, thanks in part to Ring En Español, which gave Canto's fights much coverage.

On February 10 of 1979, he retained his titles for a division record fourteenth time against a future world champion, Antonio Avelar, by a fifteen round decision.

On March 18, his reign came to an end, when he lost a fifteen round decision to Chan Hee Park in South Korea. On September 9 of that same year, he tried to recover his titles from Park in a rematch, but, after fifteen rounds, the fight ended in a draw.

Canto's career took a downward spiral after that fight. He won his following three fights, including wins against Olympic Bronze medalist Orlando Maldonado of Puerto Rico and former champion Sung-Jun Kim. In his 70th career fight, he lost to future world champion Gabriel Bernal. Canto avenged his loss to Bernal in his next fight, but lost the remaining three fights of his career by knockout.

After his final loss to Rodolfo Ortega on July 24, 1982, Canto retired from boxing for good. He had a record of 61 wins, 9 losses and 4 draws (ties), with 15 knockout wins.

Professional boxing record

Honours
He is a member of the International Boxing Hall of Fame.
Canto was voted as the #1 flyweight (along with Pancho Villa) of the 20th century by the Associated Press in 1999.

See also
List of flyweight boxing champions
List of WBC world champions
List of Mexican boxing world champions

References

External links
Boxing-Records
International Boxing Hall of Fame Bio

 Miguel Canto - CBZ Profile

|-

|-

1948 births
Living people
Boxers from Yucatán (state)
Sportspeople from Mérida, Yucatán
Flyweight boxers
World boxing champions
World flyweight boxing champions
World Boxing Council champions
International Boxing Hall of Fame inductees
Mexican male boxers